Takhti Stadium is the name of several facilities named in honour of Iranian wrestler Gholamreza Takhti:

Takhti Stadium (Abadan)
Takhti Stadium (Ahvaz)
, home ground of Malavan F.C.
Takhti Stadium (Ardabil)
Takhti Stadium (Bandar Abbas)
Takhti Stadium (Dorood), home ground of Gahar Zagros F.C.
Takhti Stadium (Jam)
Takhti Stadium (Khorramabad)
Takhti Stadium (Mashhad)
Takhti Stadium (Qom)
Takhti Stadium (Tabriz)
Takhti Stadium (Tehran)
Takhti Stadium (Yasuj), home ground of Shahrdari Yasuj F.C.